This is a list of the first-level administrative divisions of the People's Republic of China (PRC), including all provinces (except the claimed Taiwan Province), autonomous regions, special administrative regions, and municipalities, in order of their total land area as reported by the national or provincial-level government.

Notes

References 

Area
China, area